Charles Merrill Hough (May 18, 1858 – April 22, 1927) was a United States circuit judge of the United States Court of Appeals for the Second Circuit and previously was a United States District Judge of the United States District Court for the Southern District of New York.

Education and career
Born on May 18, 1858, in Philadelphia, Pennsylvania, Hough received an Artium Baccalaureus degree in 1879 from Dartmouth College and read law in 1883. He entered private practice in New York City from 1884 to 1906.

Federal judicial service
Hough was nominated by President Theodore Roosevelt on June 20, 1906, to the United States District Court for the Southern District of New York (S.D.N.Y.), to a new seat authorized by 34 Stat. 202. He was confirmed by the United States Senate on June 27, 1906, and received his commission the same day.

Hough's most historically memorable judicial ruling came in 1908 in United States vs. Press Publishing Co. Hough quashed a libel suit brought by the federal government on behalf of President Roosevelt against a newspaper, the New York World, that had been critical of the way the administration handled the Panama Canal startup. The Supreme Court of the United States unanimously upheld Hough’s ruling in 1911.

In 1909, Hough ruled in favor of the Association of Licensed Automobile Manufacturers (ALAM) against the Ford Motor Company, regarding an automobile patent issued to George B. Selden that ALAM was using to collect royalties. Hough's ruling was overturned on appeal in 1911, allowing Ford (and other manufacturers) to produce automobiles without paying a royalty.

Hough's service with S.D.N.Y. terminated on September 5, 1916, due to his elevation to the Second Circuit.

Hough was nominated by President Woodrow Wilson on August 15, 1916, to a seat on the United States Court of Appeals for the Second Circuit vacated by Judge Emile Henry Lacombe. Hough was confirmed by the Senate on August 21, 1916, and received his commission the same day. He was a member of the Conference of Senior Circuit Judges (now the Judicial Conference of the United States) in 1926. His service terminated on April 22, 1927, due to his death in New York City.

Personal life
Hough was the son of brigadier general Alfred Lacey Hough (1826–1908) and Mary Jane Merrill. He married Ethel Powers in 1906. They bore two children, Helen Anastasia Hough (1905–1978) and John Newbold Hough (1906–2000).

Notes

Sources

References

External links
 United States v. Press Publishing Co., 219 U.S. 1 (1911)
 

1858 births
1927 deaths
Dartmouth College alumni
Judges of the United States Court of Appeals for the Second Circuit
Judges of the United States District Court for the Southern District of New York
United States court of appeals judges appointed by Woodrow Wilson
United States district court judges appointed by Theodore Roosevelt
20th-century American judges
United States federal judges admitted to the practice of law by reading law